Johan van Beverwijck or Johannes Beverovicius (Dordrecht, 17 November 1594 - 19 January 1647) was a Dutch doctor and writer. Van Beverwijck was interested in new developments and contributed to medical science with his own experiments.

Biography
At the Dordtse Latin School, he was taught rhetoric by Vossius. Johan van Beverwijck studied in Leiden, Paris, Montpellier and Padua, where he obtained his PhD. Around 1618 he settled in his hometown of Dordrecht. He was the first physician in the Netherlands to defend the new ideas of the English physician William Harvey about blood circulation.

Bibliography
 1635: Lof der chirurgie
 1636: Schat der gesontheyt
 1638: Steen-stuck 
 1639: Van de wtnementheyt des vrouwelicken geslachts
 1642: Inleydinge tot de Hollantsche genees-middelen
 1642: Schat der ongesontheyt
 1645: Heel-konste ofte derde deel van de genees-konste
 1651: Alle de wercken, zo in de medicyne als chirurgie

References 

 Biographies, works and texts at the Digital Library for Dutch Literature (dbnl)  
 Lia van Gemert (1992) Johan van Beverwijck as 'institution' in the seventeenth century, Volume 8.

1594 births
1647 deaths
People from Dordrecht
16th-century Dutch physicians
17th-century Dutch physicians